The Victoria Cross is the highest award for gallantry awarded to members of the British and Commonwealth armed forces.

Victoria Cross may also refer to:

Awards
Victoria Cross for Australia
Victoria Cross (Canada)
Victoria Cross for New Zealand

Film
The Victoria Cross (film), a 1916 American silent film by Edward LeSaint
The Victoria Cross: For Valour, a 2003 BBC television historical documentary
The Victoria Cross (1912 film), an American film biography of Florence Nightingale
The Victoria Cross (1914 film), a British silent film by Harold M. Shaw

Places
Victoria Cross railway station, a proposed railway station in North Sydney, Australia
Victoria Cross Ranges, a mountain range in Alberta, Canada
Victoria Cross, Prince Edward Island, a neighbourhood in Montague, Prince Edward Island, Canada
Victoria Cross, Cork, a neighbourhood adjacent to Wilton, Cork, Ireland

Other uses
Annie Sophie Cory or Victoria Cross (1868–1952), British novelist